Kenneth E. deGraffenreid retired in 2012 from his position as Professor of Intelligence Studies at The Institute of World Politics, where he taught since the graduate school's first summer session in 1992. He is now a professor emeritus at the IWP. Numerous published sources indicate that deGraffenreid has been involved in the highest echelons of the United States Intelligence Community: a 2004 article in The New Yorker mentioned that he was responsible for all Department of Defense "Special Access Programs" (SAPs).  He is recognized as a leading authority in intelligence, foreign propaganda, information warfare, and counterintelligence. He was an early pioneer in the academic sub-discipline of intelligence studies which was in its nascency when he began teaching in 1992.

Education
deGraffenreid graduated from Purdue University in 1967, and earned an M.A. in National Security Studies and International Relations from the Catholic University of America. He started, but did not finish, work for a PhD degree. However, he did receive an honorary doctorate from the Institute of World Politics in Washington, DC in 2014.

Professional life

For ten years deGraffenreid served in the U.S. Navy as a naval aviator and intelligence officer.  Prior to his retirement as a captain in the Naval Reserve he was assigned to the Executive Panel of the Chief of Naval Operations.

deGraffenreid served as a Special Project Director with the National Strategy Information Center, a public policy institution dedicated to improving educational efforts in the field of national security.

For four years, deGraffenreid served on the professional minority staff of the Senate Select Committee on Intelligence where he had responsibilities related to national intelligence activities and programs.  He did legislative work and conducted a study of the security implications of Soviet intelligence activities directed at U.S. arms control monitoring capabilities.  Following the election of President Reagan in 1980 he participated on the transition team at the Central Intelligence Agency and in drafting the new administration's program for intelligence reform.

deGraffenreid was senior director of Intelligence Programs at the National Security Council from 1981 to 1987.  In that capacity he served as special assistant to the president for national security affairs.  He also assisted the president's national security advisor in evaluating and coordinating intelligence, counterintelligence, security countermeasures, space policy, arms control, strategic nuclear, and command, control and communication issues coming before the president and the National Security Council.

For three years he was a senior vice president with JAYCOR, a California-based research, development, and systems engineering firm.  At the firm's Virginia office he led the Strategic Programs and Analysis Group, a 180-person group working in the areas of intelligence, security, verification, counter-proliferation, strategic offensive and defensive analysis, operations security, and special operations.

From 1994 to 1999 deGraffenreid was senior associate and then vice president of National Security Research, Inc., where he was responsible for national-level U.S. intelligence and counterintelligence policies and programs, and security programs for protecting U.S. Government and commercial strategic information and operations.

For two years he was also vice president of  policy-analysis firm National Security Concepts based in the Washington, D.C., area.  He directed intelligence and defense policy and program analysis in projects ranging from missile defense support to information warfare to specialized security programs.

From 2001 to 2004 deGraffenreid was the Deputy Under Secretary of Defense for Policy Support in the Department of Defense and, from 2004 to 2005, he served as Deputy National Counterintelligence Executive to the NCIX Michelle van Cleave (who also lectured at The Institute of World Politics for many years).

He was also a senior fellow at the International Assessment and Strategy Center.

At the Institute of World Politics, he taught a number of courses during his tenure (1992–2012) including: Strategic Information Warfare (which was one of the first unclassified courses to be taught on this subject on any American campus when he first offered it in 1996), American Counterintelligence and Security for the 21st Century, American Intelligence and Protective Security: An Advanced Seminar, Intelligence and Policy, Intelligence Collection, and Introduction to Intelligence. He was also one of the founding faculty members and board members of the institute.

deGraffenreid served on the board of directors of the OPSEC Professionals Society and Center for Security Policy in Washington, D.C., and on the advisory board for the master's degree in Intelligence offered by the New York Institute of Technology.

He has contributed op-eds to various newspapers including The Washington Post, and chapters to various books, including Intelligence Requirements in the 1990s, and he edited the public version of the Cox Report concerning espionage by the People's Republic of China. He was also a frequent guest commentator on television programs including ABC's Nightline, PBS's MacNeil-Lehrer Newshour, CNN's Crossfire, and the Fox News Channel.

Personal life

A native of the Chicago area, deGraffenreid is the father of two children and lived near Annapolis, Maryland until his retirement move to Maine.

References

External links
 The Institute of World Politics, Faculty Profile 
 International Assessment and Strategy Center, Scholar Profile 
 

Living people
Counterintelligence analysts
United States Department of Defense officials
United States National Security Council staffers
United States Naval Aviators
Reagan administration personnel
George W. Bush administration personnel
Purdue University alumni
Catholic University of America alumni
Kenneth
Year of birth missing (living people)